Paleva is a rural locality (a village) in Beloyevskoye Rural Settlement, Kudymkarsky District, Perm Krai, Russia. The population was 14 as of 2010.

Geography 
It is located 26 km north-west from Kudymkar.

References 

Rural localities in Kudymkarsky District